Bors is the name of two knights in Arthurian legend, an elder and a younger. The two first appear in the 13th-century Lancelot-Grail romance prose cycle. Bors the Elder is the King of Gaunnes (Gannes/Gaunes/Ganis) during the early period of King Arthur's reign, and is the brother of King Ban of Benoic and the father of Bors the Younger and Lionel. His son Bors the Younger later becomes one of the best Knights of the Round Table and participates in the achievement of the Holy Grail.

The knights

King Bors the Elder
Bors the Elder is the brother of King Ban and the uncle of Hector de Maris  and Lancelot. He marries Evaine, the sister of Ban's wife Elaine. He has two sons: Bors the Younger and Lionel. 

Ban and Bors become King Arthur's early allies in his fight against eleven rebel kings in Britain, including Lot, Urien, and Caradoc, Arthur vows in return to help them against their Frankish enemy, King Claudas, who has been threatening their lands back in the continent. Arthur is late on his promise, though, and Claudas succeeds in his invasion, resulting in both kings' deaths. Ban's son Lancelot is taken by the Lady of the Lake, but Bors' children are raised in captivity by Claudas' retainers.

Sir Bors the Younger
Sir Bors the Younger is better known than King Bors throughout Arthurian studies. Sir Bors and Lionel live for several years at Claudas' court, but they eventually rebel against him and even slay his cruel son Dorin. Before Claudas can retaliate, the boys are rescued by a servant of the Lady of the Lake and are spirited off to be raised with their cousin Lancelot. THey all grow up to be excellent knights and go to Camelot to join King Arthur's retinue. Bors is recognisable by a distinctive scar on his forehead, and participates in most of the King's conflicts, including the eventual battle with Claudas which liberates his father's lands. Bors fathers Elyan the White when the beautiful daughter of King Brandegoris, Claire, tricks him into sleeping with her by way of a magic ring; he later introduces his son into the Round Table.

Sir Bors is always portrayed as one of the Round Table's finest, but his real glory comes on the Grail Quest, where he proves himself worthy enough to witness the Grail's mysteries alongside Galahad and Percival. Several episodes display his virtuous character; in one, a lady approaches Bors vowing to commit suicide unless he sleeps with her. He refuses to break his vow of celibacy; the lady and her maidens threaten to throw themselves off the castle battlements. As the ladies jump off, they reveal themselves to be demons set on deceiving him by playing to his sense of compassion. In another, Bors faces a dilemma where he must choose between rescuing his brother Lionel, being whipped with thorns by villains in one direction, and saving a young girl who has been abducted by a rogue knight in the other. Bors chooses to help the maiden, but prays for his brother's safety. Lionel escapes his tormentors and tries to murder Bors, and Bors does not defend himself, refusing to raise a weapon against his kinsman. Fellow Knight of the Round Table Calogrenant and a hermit try to intervene, but Lionel slays them both when they get in the way. Before he can kill his brother, however, God strikes him down with an immobilising column of fire. Bors, Galahad, and Percival go on to achieve the Holy Grail and accompany it to Sarras, a mystical island in the Holy Land, where then Galahad and Percival pass away while there. Bors is the only one to return, and the text of the Vulgate Queste is presented as a purported written record of Bors telling the full story of the quest back in Camelot. At the end of the entire Vulgate Cycle, Bors further emerges as the only surviving main character and a successor to Arthur after the King's death.

In Thomas Malory's Le Morte d'Arthur, based on the French prose romance tradition, Sir Bors reluctantly agrees to fight as Queen Guinevere's champion in a trial by combat after she is accused of poisoning a cousin of Sir Mador de la Porte. Refusing at first, as her usual champion Lancelot had left Camelot earlier because of her, Bors relents after the desperate Guinevere kneels before him. He is about to joust with Mador for her sake when Lancelot arrives to take his place incognito. Along with the rest of their family, Bors later takes Lancelot's side after Lancelot's affair with Guinevere is exposed and Arthur sentenced her to death. He helps to rescue the Queen from her execution at the stake and is one of Lancelot's kinsmen who then accompany him into exile from England. Together with his brother Lionel, Bors becomes one of Lancelot's most valorous and trusted aides in the ensuing war, during which he barely survives his horseback duel with Arthur's second-in-command Gawain. On another occasion, Bors has an opportunity to kill the dehorsed Arthur himself, but is stopped by Lancelot. In return for his service, Lancelot crowns Lionel the King of France, while Sir Bors becomes the ruler of King Claudas' lands. While the factions are still fighting, Mordred betrays Arthur and takes the throne. Lancelot hears of this and goes to aid Arthur, but arrives too late. Lancelot searches for Guinevere; after some time without news, Lionel goes looking for him is killed. Sir Bors sends most of the army home, and goes to look for Lancelot with a few other of their kinsmen. They eventually find him living as a priest and decide to join him.

In the Lancelot-Grail and the Post-Vulgate Mort d'Artu, Lancelot and his men return to Britain to fight Mordred's sons, who have taken over. In the battle, Mordred's elder son, Meleon or Melehan, mortally wounds Lionel. Bors kills Melehan with one blow, avenging his brother. Lancelot kills Mordred's second, unnamed son.

Modern portrayals

In Adventures of Sir Galahad, a Columbia Pictures serial from 1949, Sir Bors is played by Charles King as a comedy relief sidekick for Galahad.
In T.H. White's 1958 novel The Once and Future King, Bors is described as a "misogynist" and an "almost-virgin", and generally something of a curmudgeon.
In 1975's Monty Python and the Holy Grail, Sir Bors (played by Terry Gilliam) is the first Knight of the Round Table to succumb to the Killer Rabbit of Caerbannog. Bors appears in the stage musical adaptation of the film, entitle Spamalot. 
In 2004's King Arthur, British actor Ray Winstone plays a different interpretation of Bors. He is one of Arthur's Roman-Sarmatian soldiers, and is brash, bold and violent in a departure from the saintly earlier figure. He is brother to Dagonet; has a native lover Vanora, and more than ten illegitimate children. Vanora is believed to be an early identity of Guenevere; the Vanora of the film is also some-time mistress to fellow Sarmatian soldier Lancelot, who is strongly hinted to be the father of Bors' youngest child, and possibly others (for example Gilly, the eldest), as they have dark hair whereas neither of their parents do.

References

External links

Bors at The Camelot Project

Arthurian characters
Knights of the Round Table